Han Wenbao (born May 17, 1997) is a Chinese kickboxer, currently signed with Wu Lin Feng. As of March 2023, he is ranked as the tenth best super featherweight kickboxer in the world by Combat Press.

Professional kickboxing career
Wenbao took part in the 2017 K-1 welterweight tournament, which was held at K-1 World GP 2017 Welterweight Championship Tournament on September 18, 2017. He was eliminated in the quarterfinals however, as he lost a unanimous decision to Hitoshi Tsukakoshi.

Over the course of 2021, Wenbao was able to amass enough points in the Wu Lin Feng -70 kg World Contender League to earn himself a place in the final four tournament. Although he was able to beat Ren Guohao by unanimous decision in the semifinals at Wu Lin Feng 2021: WLF on Haihua Island on October 30, 2021, he himself suffered a unanimous decision loss at the hands of Ouyang Feng in the tournament finals at Wu Lin Feng 2021: World Contender League 7th Stage on November 27, 2021.

Wenbao participated in a one-day, eight man -67 kg tournament at Wu Lin Feng 2023: Chinese New Year on February 4, 2023. He earned his place in the finals, where he faced Zhou Jiaqiang, with unanimous decision victories over Mikel Sortino in the quarterfinals and Shang Xifeng in the semifinals. Wenbao captured the tournament title with a second-round technical knockout of Jiaqiang.

Championships and accomplishments
Wu Lin Feng
2021 WLF World -70 kg Contender League Runner-up
2023 WLF World -67 kg Tournament Winner

Fight record

|-  style="background:#cfc;"
| 2023-03-18 || Win ||align=left| Younes Smaili || Wu Lin Feng 535: China vs Netherlands || Tangshan, China || Decision || 3 ||3:00 

|-  style="text-align:center; background:#cfc"
| 2023-02-04 || Win ||align=left| Zhou Jiaqiang || Wu Lin Feng 2023: Chinese New Year, Tournament Final || Tangshan, China || TKO (Corner stoppage) || 2 ||  
|-
! style=background:white colspan=9 |
|-
|-  style="text-align:center; background:#cfc"
| 2023-02-04 || Win ||align=left| Shang Xifeng || Wu Lin Feng 2023: Chinese New Year, Tournament Semifinal || Tangshan, China || Decision (Unanimous) || 3 || 3:00
|-
|-  style="text-align:center; background:#cfc"
| 2023-02-04 || Win ||align=left| Mikel Sortino || Wu Lin Feng 2023: Chinese New Year, Tournament Quarterfinal || Tangshan, China || Decision (Unanimous) || 3 || 3:00
|-
|-  style="text-align:center; background:#fbb"
| 2022-12-10 || Loss ||align=left| Luo Chao || Wu Lin Feng 532, Tournament Semifinal || Zhengzhou, China || Decision (Unanimous) || 3 || 3:00
|-
|-  style="text-align:center; background:#cfc"
| 2022-09-24 || Win ||align=left| Liu Yunlong || Wu Lin Feng 531 || Zhengzhou, China || Decision (Unanimous) || 3 || 3:00
|-
|-  style="text-align:center; background:#cfc"
| 2022-04-10 || Win ||align=left| Choeung Lvay || Wu Lin Feng 2022: WLF in Cambodia || Angkor, Cambodia || KO (Punches) || 1 || 
|-
|-  style="text-align:center; background:#fbb"
| 2022-03-26 || Loss ||align=left| Luo Chao || Wu Lin Feng 528, Tournament Semifinal || Zhengzhou, China || Decision (Unanimous) || 3 || 3:00
|-
|-  style="text-align:center; background:#fbb"
| 2021-11-27 || Loss ||align=left| Ouyang Feng || Wu Lin Feng 2021: World Contender League 7th Stage, Tournament Final || Zhengzhou, China || Decision (Unanimous) || 3 || 3:00
|-
! style=background:white colspan=9 |
|-
|-  style="text-align:center; background:#cfc"
| 2021-10-30 || Win ||align=left| Ren Guohao || Wu Lin Feng 2021: WLF on Haihua Island, Tournament Semifinal || Zhengzhou, China || Decision (Unanimous) || 3 || 3:00
|-
|-  style="text-align:center; background:#cfc"
| 2021-09-25 || Win ||align=left| Liu Lei || Wu Lin Feng 2021: WLF in Tangshan || Zhengzhou, China || Decision (Unanimous) || 3 || 3:00
|-
|-  style="text-align:center; background:#cfc"
| 2021-07-03 || Win||align=left| Luo Chao || Wu Lin Feng 2021: World Contender League 5th Stage || Zhengzhou, China || Decision (Unanimous) || 3 ||3:00 
|-
|-  style="text-align:center; background:#cfc"
| 2021-04-24 || Win ||align=left| Qu Hao || Wu Lin Feng 2021: World Contender League 2nd Stage || Zhengzhou, China || Decision (Unanimous) || 3 || 3:00
|-
|-  style="text-align:center; background:#fbb"
| 2021-03-27 || Loss ||align=left| Ouyang Feng || Wu Lin Feng 2021: World Contender League 1st Stage || Zhengzhou, China || Decision (Unanimous) || 3 || 3:00
|-
|-  style="text-align:center; background:#fbb"
| 2020-11-28 || Loss ||align=left| Liu Lei || Wu Lin Feng 2020: China 70kg Championship Tournament, Tournament Semifinal || Zhengzhou, China || Decision (Unanimous) || 3 || 3:00
|-
|-  style="text-align:center; background:#cfc"
| 2020-11-28 || Win ||align=left| Xu Liu || Wu Lin Feng 2020: China 70kg Championship Tournament, Tournament Quarterfinal || Zhengzhou, China || Decision (Unanimous) || 3 || 3:00

|-
|-  style="background:#cfc;"
| 2020-08-20 || Win ||align=left| Han Junjie || Rise of Heroes 20, final|| China || Decision || 3 ||3:00 

|-
|-  style="background:#cfc;"
| 2020-08-20 || Win ||align=left| Chang Yuhang || Rise of Heroes 20, semi-final|| China || Decision || 3 ||3:00 

|-
|-  style="background:#cfc;"
| 2020-08-08 || Win ||align=left| Han Junjie || Rise of Heroes || China || Decision || 3 ||3:00 

|-
|-  style="background:#cfc;"
| 2020-07-30 || Win ||align=left| Ayati || Rise of Heroes || China || TKO (punches)||  || 
|-
|-  style="background:#cfc;"
| 2020-07-23 || Win ||align=left| Qu Peng || Rise of Heroes || China || TKO || 1 ||0:24 

|-
|-  style="background:#cfc;"
| 2019-12-28 || Win ||align=left| Artur Isayants || Glory of Heroes 44 || China || Decision || 3 || 3:00

|-
|-  style="background:#cfc;"
| 2019-09-07 || Win ||align=left| Katsuya Jinbo || Glory of Heroes 41 || Qinhuangdao, China || Ext.R Decision || 4 || 3:00

|-  style="background:#cfc;"
| 2019-08-05 || Win ||align=left| Ahmad Mabrouk || Glory of Heroes 40 || Cairo, Egypt || Decision || 3|| 3:00

|-  style="background:#cfc;"
| 2019-06-22 || Win ||align=left| Anthony Gazel || Glory of Heroes 39  || Xinyi, China || TKO (low kicks) || 2 ||

|-  style="background:#cfc;"
| 2019-04-16 || Win ||align=left| Jordan Syme  || Glory of Heroes 37 || Auckland, New Zealand || Decision (Unanimous) || 3|| 3:00

|-  style="text-align:center; background:#cfc"
| 2018-10-20 || Win ||align=left| Damien Cazambo || Glory of Heroes 36: Ziyang || Sichuan, China || Decision (Unanimous) || 3 || 3:00
|-
|-  style="text-align:center; background:#cfc"
| 2018-09-15 || Win ||align=left| Dzmitry || Glory of Heroes 34: Tongling || Anhui, China || TKO || 2 || 
|-
|-  style="text-align:center; background:#cfc"
| 2018-05-26 || Win ||align=left| Kostas Fasomitakis || Glory of Heroes 31: Beijing || Beijing, China || Decision (Unanimous) || 3 || 3:00
|-
|-  style="text-align:center; background:#cfc"
| 2018-03-03 || Win ||align=left| Thomas Maguren || Glory of Heroes: New Zealand vs China || Auckland, New Zealand || Decision (Unanimous) || 3 || 3:00
|-
|-  style="text-align:center; background:#cfc"
| 2018-02-02 || Win ||align=left| Mingkwan || Glory of Heroes: Chengdu || Chengdu, China || Decision (Unanimous) || 3 || 3:00
|-
|-  style="text-align:center; background:#fbb"
| 2018-01-06 || Loss ||align=left| Mohamed Hendouf|| Glory of Heroes: Wudang Mountain, Tournament Semifinals || Hubei, China || Decision (Unanimous) || 3 || 3:00
|-
|-  style="text-align:center; background:#fbb"
| 2017-09-18 || Loss ||align=left| Hitoshi Tsukakoshi || K-1 World GP 2017 Welterweight Championship Tournament, Tournament Quarterfinals || Saitama, Japan || Decision (Unanimous) || 3 || 3:00
|-
|-  style="text-align:center; background:#fbb"
| 2017-05-27 || Loss ||align=left| Luis Passos || Glory of Heroes: Portugal & Strikers League, Tournament Semifinals || Carcavelos, Portugal || Decision (Unanimous) || 3 || 3:00
|-
|-  style="text-align:center; background:#cfc"
| 2017-04-28 || Win ||align=left| Tongdee Kittipong || Rise of Heroes / Conquest of Heroes: Chengde || Chengde, China || Decision (Unanimous) || 3 || 3:00
|-
|-  style="text-align:center; background:#cfc"
| 2017-02-18|| Win ||align=left| Harley Love || Rise of Heroes 7: China vs New Zealand || Auckland, New Zealand || Decision (Majority) || 3 || 3:00
|-
|-  style="text-align:center; background:#cfc"
| 2017-01-13 || Win ||align=left| Teerachai || Glory of Heroes 6 || Jiyuan, China || KO || 2 || 
|-
|-  style="text-align:center; background:#fbb"
| 2016-08-27 || Loss ||align=left| Hussein Al Mansouri || Wu Lin Feng 2016: China vs Australia || Sydney, Australia || Decision (Unanimous) || 3 || 3:00

|-  style="text-align:center; background:#cfc"
| 2016-12-27 || Win ||align=left| Napat  || Wu Lin Feng ||  China || Decision || 3 || 3:00

|-  style="text-align:center; background:#cfc"
| 2016-11-27 || Win ||align=left| Julien  || Wu Lin Feng ||  China || Decision || 3 || 3:00

|-  style="text-align:center; background:#cfc"
| 2016-07-15 || Win ||align=left| Jin Bao  || Wu Lin Feng ||  China || Decision || 3 || 3:00

|-  style="text-align:center; background:#cfc"
| 2016-03-05 || Win ||align=left|   || Wu Lin Feng ||  China || Decision || 3 || 3:00

|-  style="text-align:center; background:#cfc"
| 2015-11-22 || Win ||align=left| Mangsing  || Wu Lin Feng ||  China || Decision || 3 || 3:00

|-  style="text-align:center; background:#fbb"
| 2015-10-03 || Loss ||align=left| Wang Baoduo || Wu Lin Feng ||  China || Decision || 3 || 3:00

|-  style="text-align:center; background:#fbb"
| 2015-07-04 || Loss ||align=left| Zhao Chunyang || Wu Lin Feng ||  China || Decision || 3 || 3:00

|-  style="text-align:center; background:#cfc"
| 2015-06-02 || Win ||align=left|  || Wu Lin Feng ||  China || Decision || 3 || 3:00

|-  style="text-align:center; background:#cfc"
| 2015-04-04 || Win ||align=left|  || Wu Lin Feng ||  China || Decision || 3 || 3:00

|-  style="text-align:center; background:#cfc"
| 2014-12-31 || Win ||align=left| Yeermaike Bahetikelide || Wu Lin Feng ||  China || Decision || 3 || 3:00

|-  style="text-align:center; background:#cfc"
| 2014-11-09 || Win ||align=left| Chen Yage || Wu Lin Feng ||  China || Decision || 3 || 3:00

|-  style="text-align:center; background:#cfc"
| 2014-10-06 || Win ||align=left| Chen Yage || Wu Lin Feng || Henan province, China || Decision || 3 || 3:00
|-
|-
| colspan=9 | Legend:

See also
 List of male kickboxers

References

Chinese male kickboxers
1997 births
Living people
Sportspeople from Hebei